Omer Fadida (born 17 July 1990 in Kfar Saba) is an Israeli footballer striker who plays as a Vice-captain for Israeli National League club Hapoel Kfar Saba.

Career
Fadida grew up in Hapoel Kfar Saba and played in the club until 2013, scoring 15 goals in 90 caps.

Fadida signed at Hapoel Tel Aviv in 2013 with his friend from Hapoel Kfar Saba, Avraham Chekol.

On 15 September 2014 returned to Hapoel Kfar Saba.

References

1990 births
Living people
Israeli footballers
Israeli Jews
Footballers from Kfar Saba
Hapoel Kfar Saba F.C. players
Hapoel Tel Aviv F.C. players
Hapoel Hadera F.C. players
Hapoel Nof HaGalil F.C. players
Maccabi Petah Tikva F.C. players
Liga Leumit players
Israeli Premier League players
Israeli people of Moroccan-Jewish descent
Association football forwards